Seri Shehr Shah is a union council of Abbottabad District in Khyber-Pakhtunkhwa province of Pakistan. According to the 2017 Census of Pakistan, the population is 16,228.

Subdivisions
Aziz Mang
Desal
Khan
Mohar Khurd
Sadra
Seegah
Sir Bhanna

References

Union councils of Abbottabad District